Murarirao Yeshwantrao Ghorpade (7 December 1931 – 29 October 2011) was an Indian politician. He was the son of the last Raja of the Sandur State, a former Princely State. He was a seven-time MLA and one-time MP from Raichur, Karnataka. He also served as Minister for Rural Development, Panchayat Raj and Finance in the Karnataka State Government. Ghorpade was the Chairman-emeritus of Sandur Manganese and Iron Ore Pvt. Ltd. (SMIORE). He held a Master's Degree in Economics from the University of Cambridge.

Ghorpade was a wildlife photographer famous for his black-and-white photography.

References

1931 births
2011 deaths
People from Bellary
People from Raichur district
Indian National Congress politicians from Karnataka
Mysore MLAs 1962–1967
Mysore MLAs 1967–1972
Mysore MLAs 1972–1977
Members of the Mysore Legislature
India MPs 1984–1989
Lok Sabha members from Karnataka
State cabinet ministers of Karnataka